This article uses the Portuguese naming customs, the maternal surname is Martins and the paternal surname is Manso

Manuel Martins Manso (21 November 1793 – 11 December 1871) was a Portuguese bishop, he was bishop of Funchal and of Guarda.

Biography

He was nominated Bishop of Funchal, a diocese that includes Madeira and its surrounding islands in 1849 and remained until 1858 amid serious clerical and social upheavals, the post was later taken by D. Patrício Xavier de Moura.  He returned to Continental Portugal and after resigning as bishop of Funchal for health reasons and on 18 March became the Guarda later in 1850 up to his death in 1871, afterwards the seat was vacant until 1878 where it was taken by D. Tomás. Gomes de Almeida.

He was the great nephew of the 1st Viscount of Vale Pereiro.

References

External links
Manuel Martins Manso at Bragança Net 

1793 births
1871 deaths
People from Mogadouro
19th-century Roman Catholic bishops in Portugal
Portuguese politicians